Prouvost is a surname. Notable people with the surname include:

Évelyne Prouvost (1939-2017), French businesswoman
Gustave Prouvost (1887-?), French water polo player
Jean Prouvost (1885-1978), French businessman, media owner and politician
Laure Prouvost (born 1978), French artist